Anthony Cassar  (born March 9, 1996) is an American freestyle wrestler and graduated folkstyle wrestler. He is a one-time NCAA Division I champion and a one-time Big Ten Conference champion out of Penn State University, as well as a one-time NJSIAA title holder as a high schooler.

Folkstyle career

High school 
Raised in Rocky Hill, New Jersey, Cassar started wrestling at around the age of 7 to 8. He attended Montgomery High School in New Jersey. During his freshman, sophomore and junior years, he never qualified for state and compiled a record of 73 wins and 30 losses. In his senior year, he finally qualified for state and became the fourth person in the history of the state to win the tournament after never qualifying before. He compiled an undefeated record of 43 wins and no losses in his final season and an 116–30 record overall.

College 
After his performance as a high school senior, he committed to Penn State University. He redshirted 2014-15 and compiled a record of 15-8 while wrestling unattached. He originally missed his freshman and sophomore seasons due to an injury but was granted one more year of eligibility by the NCAA, so he only lost his freshman year but would compete as a sophomore in 2017–18. As a sophomore, he compiled a record of 16-2 during regular season with a Keystone Classic title and a third-place finish at the Southern Scuffle after being defeated by his teammate Shakur Rasheed. Despite his success, he was left in the bench for the post season and the teammate whom he had lost to was chosen as the starter. In his next season, he moved up to heavyweight (285 pounds) and saw immediate success, posting a record of 21-1 during regular season with lone loss to Derek White at the Southern Scuffle's finals. In the post season, he made his way to the first-place finish at the Big Ten Championships with wins over the #6 and #7 ranked wrestlers and top-ranked Gable Steveson at the finale. At the 2019 NCAA championships, he got the victory over multiple ranked wrestlers including Steveson in the semifinals to make his way to the finale. In the finals, he avenged his regular season's loss on a dominant major decision win over Derek White to claim the championship on his first trip to the NCAA championships. In his final season, he had posted a record of 3 wins and no losses but was affected by a shoulder injury while competing at a freestyle event and subsequently announced his career as a collegiate wrestler was over.

Cassar graduated with a record of 49 wins and 3 losses during his time as a Nittany Lion.

Freestyle career 
As a junior level freestyle wrestler, Cassar was the 15' World Team Member at 96 kilograms and represented the USA at that year's World Championships, where he placed eighth.

2019 
Cassar made his senior level debut on December 22 at the US Nationals, in an attempt to earn a shot at the Olympic Trials. He dominantly won his first two bouts to reach the semifinals, where he was forced to abandon the match due to a shoulder injury and forfeited his next contests too. This injury also caused the end of his senior season at Penn State.

2020 
Cassar was scheduled to compete at the Last Chance Olympic Trials qualifier on March 27 at Millersville, Pennsylvania. However, the event was postponed along with the Olympic Games and Trials due to the COVID-19 pandemic.

Mixed martial arts career 
On May 30, 2020, it was announced that Cassar had signed an MMA management deal with First Round Management and is expected to make the transition after the 20' (21') Summer Olympics. He has been training at American Top Team in the meantime, training with UFC's welterweight contender Jorge Masvidal and Nittany Lion teammate and three-time NCAA champion Bo Nickal, who is also expected to transition to mixed martial arts and train full-time at ATT after the Olympics. Anthony was set to make his pro MMA debut on November 19, 2022, against Idrees Wasi. Cassar would go on to win the bout via second round triangle armbar.

Mixed martial arts record

|-
|Win
|align=center|1–0
|Idrees Wasi
|Submission (arm-triangle choke)
|iKON FC 6
|
|align=center|1
|align=center|3:11
|Kissimmee, Florida, United States
|
|-

Freestyle record 

! colspan="7"| Senior Freestyle Matches
|-
!  Res.
!  Record
!  Opponent
!  Score
!  Date
!  Event
!  Location
|-
! style=background:white colspan=7 |
|-
|Win
|2-0
|align=left| Ceron Francisco
|style="font-size:88%"|10-2
|style="font-size:88%" rowspan=2|December 22, 2019
|style="font-size:88%" rowspan=2|2019 Senior Nationals - US Olympic Trials Qualifier
|style="text-align:left;font-size:88%;" rowspan=2|
 Fort Worth, Texas
|-
|Win
|1-0
|align=left| Jeremy Benton
|style="font-size:88%"|TF 10-0
|-

NCAA record 

! colspan="8"| NCAA Division I Record
|-
!  Res.
!  Record
!  Opponent
!  Score
!  Date
!  Event
|-
! style=background:lighgrey colspan=6 |End of 2019-2020 Season (senior year)
|-
|Win
|49-3
|align=left| Jordan Wood
|style="font-size:88%"|9-4
|style="font-size:88%"|December 6, 2019
|style="font-size:88%"|Penn State - Lehigh Dual
|-
|Win
|48-3
|align=left| Tanner Hall
|style="font-size:88%"|9-5
|style="font-size:88%"|November 22, 2019
|style="font-size:88%"|Penn State - Arizona State Dual
|-
|Win
|47-3
|align=left| John Birchmeier
|style="font-size:88%"|Fall
|style="font-size:88%"|November 10, 2019
|style="font-size:88%"|Navy - Penn State Dual
|-
! style=background:lighgrey colspan=6 |Start of 2019-2020 Season (senior year)
|-
! style=background:lighgrey colspan=6 |End of 2018-2019 Season (junior year)
|-
! style=background:white colspan=6 |2019 NCAA championships  at 285 lbs
|-
|Win
|46-3
|align=left|Derek White
|style="font-size:88%"|MD 10-1
|style="font-size:88%" rowspan=5|March 21, 2019
|style="font-size:88%" rowspan=5|2019 NCAA Division I Wrestling Championships
|-
|Win
|45-3
|align=left|Gable Steveson
|style="font-size:88%"|4-3
|-
|Win
|44-3
|align=left|Trent Hillger
|style="font-size:88%"|4-0
|-
|Win
|43-3
|align=left|Tate Orndorff
|style="font-size:88%"|MD 10-2
|-
|Win
|42-3
|align=left|Antonio Pelusi
|style="font-size:88%"|Fall
|-
! style=background:white colspan=6 |2019 Big Ten Conference  at 285 lbs
|-
|Win
|41-3
|align=left|Gable Steveson
|style="font-size:88%"|4-3
|style="font-size:88%" rowspan=4|Mar 9, 2019
|style="font-size:88%" rowspan=4|2019 Big Ten Championships
|-
|Win
|40-3
|align=left|Conan Jennings 
|style="font-size:88%"|MD 10-2
|-
|Win
|39-3
|align=left|David Jensen 
|style="font-size:88%"|8-4
|-
|Win
|38-3
|align=left|Jacob Aven
|style="font-size:88%"|MD 12-4
|-
|Win
|37-3
|align=left| Sam Schuyler
|style="font-size:88%"|MD 16-5
|style="font-size:88%"|February 24, 2019
|style="font-size:88%"|Buffalo - Penn State Dual
|-
|Win
|36-3
|align=left| Deuce Rachal
|style="font-size:88%"|Fall
|style="font-size:88%"|February 17, 2019
|style="font-size:88%"|Penn State - Illinois Dual
|-
|Win
|35-3
|align=left| Chase Beard
|style="font-size:88%"|TF 21-6
|style="font-size:88%"|February 15, 2019
|style="font-size:88%"|Michigan State - Penn State Dual
|-
|Win
|34-3
|align=left| Chase Singletary
|style="font-size:88%"|MD 18-8
|style="font-size:88%"|February 8, 2019
|style="font-size:88%"|Penn State - Ohio State Dual
|-
|Win
|33-3
|align=left| Mason Parris
|style="font-size:88%"|MD 19-8
|style="font-size:88%"|February 1, 2019
|style="font-size:88%"|Michigan - Penn State Dual
|-
|Win
|32-3
|align=left| Fletcher Miller
|style="font-size:88%"|11-5
|style="font-size:88%"|January 27, 2019
|style="font-size:88%"|Penn State - Indiana Dual
|-
|Win
|31-3
|align=left| Jacob Aven
|style="font-size:88%"|MD 14-4
|style="font-size:88%"|January 25, 2019
|style="font-size:88%"|Penn State - Purdue Dual
|-
|Win
|30-3
|align=left| David Jensen
|style="font-size:88%"|10-4
|style="font-size:88%"|January 20, 2019
|style="font-size:88%"|Nebraska - Penn State Dual
|-
|Win
|29-3
|align=left| Trent Hillger
|style="font-size:88%"|11-5
|style="font-size:88%"|January 13, 2019
|style="font-size:88%"|Wisconsin - Penn State Dual
|-
|Win
|28-3
|align=left| Conan Jennings
|style="font-size:88%"|MD 12-2
|style="font-size:88%"|January 11, 2019
|style="font-size:88%"|Penn State - Northwestern Dual
|-
! style=background:white colspan=6 |2019 Southern Scuffle  at 285 lbs
|-
|Loss
|27-3
|align=left| Derek White
|style="font-size:88%"|2-3
|style="font-size:88%" rowspan=5|January 1, 2019
|style="font-size:88%" rowspan=5|2019 Southern Scuffle
|-
|Win
|27-2
|align=left| Matt Voss
|style="font-size:88%"|MD 14-6
|-
|Win
|26-2
|align=left| Gannon Gremmel
|style="font-size:88%"|MD 16-5
|-
|Win
|25-2
|align=left| Ryan Cloud
|style="font-size:88%"|MD 16-4
|-
|Win
|24-2
|align=left| Jordan Earnest
|style="font-size:88%"|MD 18-4
|-
|Win
|23-2
|align=left| Brady Gilliland-Daniel
|style="font-size:88%"|Fall
|style="font-size:88%"|December 14, 2018
|style="font-size:88%"|Arizona State - Penn State Dual
|-
|Win
|22-2
|align=left| Jordan Wood
|style="font-size:88%"|MD 12-3
|style="font-size:88%"|December 2, 2018
|style="font-size:88%"|Lehigh - Penn State Dual
|-
|Win
|21-2
|align=left| Brandon Stokes
|style="font-size:88%"|Fall
|style="font-size:88%"|November 30, 2018
|style="font-size:88%"|Penn State - Bucknell Dual
|-
! style=background:white colspan=6 |2018 Keystone Classic  at 285 lbs
|-
|Win
|20-2
|align=left| Joseph Goodhart
|style="font-size:88%"|MD 11-3
|style="font-size:88%" rowspan=3|November 18, 2018
|style="font-size:88%" rowspan=3|2018 Keystone Classic
|-
|Win
|19-2
|align=left| Nick Nevills
|style="font-size:88%"|7-2
|-
|Win
|18-2
|align=left| Ben Goldin
|style="font-size:88%"|Fall
|-
|Win
|17-2
|align=left| Billy Bolia
|style="font-size:88%"|TF 17-2
|style="font-size:88%"|November 11, 2018
|style="font-size:88%"|Kent State - Penn State Dual
|-
! style=background:lighgrey colspan=6 |Start of 2018-2019 Season (junior year)
|-
! style=background:lighgrey colspan=6 |End of 2017-2018 Season (sophomore year)
|-
|Win
|16-2
|align=left| Kollin Moore
|style="font-size:88%"|6-3
|style="font-size:88%"|February 3, 2018
|style="font-size:88%"|Ohio State - Penn State Dual
|-
|Win
|15-2
|align=left| Anthony Messner
|style="font-size:88%"|MD 16-5
|style="font-size:88%"|January 28, 2018
|style="font-size:88%"|Penn State - Rutgers Dual
|-
|Win
|14-2
|align=left| David-Brian Whisler
|style="font-size:88%"|MD 14-5
|style="font-size:88%"|January 21, 2018
|style="font-size:88%"|Penn State - Maryland Dual
|-
|Win
|13-2
|align=left| Nick May
|style="font-size:88%"|MD 16-2
|style="font-size:88%"|January 14, 2018
|style="font-size:88%"|Penn State - Michigan State Dual
|-
! style=background:white colspan=6 |2018 Southern Scuffle  at 197 lbs
|-
|Win
|12-2
|align=left| Stephen Loiseau
|style="font-size:88%"|4-1
|style="font-size:88%" rowspan=5|January 1, 2018
|style="font-size:88%" rowspan=5|2018 Southern Scuffle
|-
|Win
|11-2
|align=left| Scottie Boykin
|style="font-size:88%"|9-7
|-
|Loss
|10-2
|align=left| Shakur Rasheed
|style="font-size:88%"|4-6
|-
|Win
|10-1
|align=left| Stephen Loiseau
|style="font-size:88%"|4-1
|-
|Win
|9-1
|align=left| Tristan Sponseller
|style="font-size:88%"|13-10
|-
|Win
|8-1
|align=left| Spencer Irick
|style="font-size:88%"|MD 16-5
|style="font-size:88%"|December 17, 2017
|style="font-size:88%"|Indiana - Penn State Dual
|-
|Win
|7-1
|align=left| Jake Jakobsen
|style="font-size:88%"|8-3
|style="font-size:88%"|December 3, 2017
|style="font-size:88%"|Penn State - Lehigh Dual
|-
! style=background:white colspan=6 |2017 Keystone Classic  at 197 lbs
|-
|Win
|6-1
|align=left| Frank Mattiace
|style="font-size:88%"|7-4
|style="font-size:88%" rowspan=4|November 18, 2017
|style="font-size:88%" rowspan=4|2017 Keystone Classic
|-
|Win
|5-1
|align=left| Matt McCutcheon
|style="font-size:88%"|5-6
|-
|Win
|4-1
|align=left| Alec Schenk
|style="font-size:88%"|12-5
|-
|Win
|3-1
|align=left| Robert Ng
|style="font-size:88%"|MD 12-4
|-
|Win
|2-1
|align=left| Mark Tracy
|style="font-size:88%"|10-4
|style="font-size:88%"|November 17, 2017
|style="font-size:88%"|Penn State - Binghamton Dual
|-
|Loss
|1-1
|align=left| Garrett Hoffman
|style="font-size:88%"|8-11
|style="font-size:88%"|November 12, 2017
|style="font-size:88%"|Bucknell - Penn State Dual
|-
|Win
|1-0
|align=left| Rocco Caywood
|style="font-size:88%"|10-3
|style="font-size:88%"|November 9, 2017
|style="font-size:88%"|Army - Penn State Dual
|-
! style=background:lighgrey colspan=6 |Start of 2017-2018 Season (sophomore year)

Stats 

!  Season
!  Year
!  School
!  Rank
!  Weigh Class
!  Record
!  Win
!  Bonus
|-
|2020
|Senior
|style="font-size:88%" rowspan=3|Penn State University
|#2 (DNQ)
|style="font-size:88%" rowspan=2|285
|3-0
|100.00%
|33.33%
|-
|2019
|Junior
|#2 (1st)
|30-1
|96.77%
|70.97%
|-
|2018
|Sophomore
|#7 (DNQ)
|197
|16-2
|88.89%
|27.78%
|-
|colspan=5 bgcolor="LIGHTGREY"|Career
|bgcolor="LIGHTGREY"|49-3
|bgcolor="LIGHTGREY"|94.23%
|bgcolor="LIGHTGREY"|53.85%

Collegiate awards & records 

Junior
 NCAA Division I (285 lbs)
 Big Ten Conference (285 lbs)
Team's first NCAA heavyweight champion in the century

References

External links
 
 
 

Living people
1996 births
Montgomery High School (New Jersey) alumni
People from Rocky Hill, New Jersey
Penn State Nittany Lions wrestlers
Sportspeople from Somerset County, New Jersey
American male sport wrestlers